Statistics of Swedish football Division 2 for the 1931–32 season.

League standings

Division 2 Norra 1931–32
Teams from a large part of northern Sweden, approximately above the province of Medelpad, were not allowed to play in the national league system until the 1953–54 season, and a championship was instead played to decide the best team in Norrland.

Division 2 Södra 1931–32

References
Sweden - List of final tables (Clas Glenning)

Swedish Football Division 2 seasons
2
Sweden